Chikunia albipes is a species of comb-footed spider in the family Theridiidae. It is found in Russia, China, Korea, and Japan.

References

Theridiidae
Spiders described in 1935